The south-western orange-tailed slider (Lerista distinguenda)  is a species of skink found in Western Australia.

References

Lerista
Reptiles described in 1910
Taxa named by Franz Werner